Jean-Jacques Courvoisier (died 1652) was a Minim Friar from the County of Burgundy and a spiritual author in the Spanish Netherlands.

Life
Courvoisier may have been born in Mons. He entered the Minims in Burgundy but was transferred to the Low Countries in 1617 when a new province of the order was established there. He served as head of the Belgian province from 1635 to 1638. On 21 June 1644 the general chapter divided the Belgian province into Flemish and Walloon provinces, with the houses of Antwerp, Brussels, Geraardsbergen and Leuven going to the one, and Anderlecht, Douai, Liège, Lille and Mons to the other. Couvoisier served as head of the Walloon province from September 1650 until his death, in Anderlecht, on 1 April 1652.

Writings
  (Brussels, Jean Pepermans, 1632)
  (Brussels, François Vivien, 1634)
  (Brussels, Lucas van Meerbeeck, 1636)
  (Brussels, Godefroy Schoevaerts, 1638)
  (Brussels, Godefroy Schoevaerts, 1638)
  (Brussels, Godrefroy Schoevaerts, 1639)
  (Antwerp, Caesar Joachim Trognaesius, 1642)
  (Antwerp, Caesar Joachim Trognaesius, 1642)
  (3 vols., Brussels, Godefroy Schoevarts, 1645)
  (Brussels, Godefroy Schoevaerts, 1646)

References

Date of birth unknown
1652 deaths
Minims (religious order)
 People from Mons
Belgian Roman Catholic clergy